Fatima Zahra Tagnaout (born 20 January 1999) is a Moroccan footballer who plays as a midfielder for ASFAR and the Morocco women's national team.

Club career
Tagnaout has played for ASFAR in Morocco.

International career
Tagnaout has capped for Morocco at senior level.

International goals
Scores and results list Morocco's goal tally first

Honor
 IFFHS Africa Team of The Year: 2022

See also
List of Morocco women's international footballers

References

External links

1999 births
Living people
Moroccan women's footballers
Women's association football midfielders
Morocco women's international footballers